TVS (formerly TV Sarawak) is a linear digital television channel which provides news and programming from the region of Sarawak to the state itself plus other parts of Malaysia. TVS can be watched nationwide via the platform Astro and myFreeview on channel 122.

History 

Radio Television Malaysia (RTM) planned to launch a television station for Sarawak as part of the government digitalization plan of Malaysian television. The plan, however, did not come to fruition as the plan did not come to realization by which it was replaced by OKEY and the state television plan was later undertaken by a private company only to be launched as a streaming channel.

The free-to-air license was eventually given the green-light in an announcement by Sim Kui Hian, Sarawak's Minister for Local Government and Housing. The station would be given an early broadcast on 10 October 2020 in conjunction with the Yang di-Pertua Negeri of Sarawak's Birthday before launching officially the next day on 11 October.

On 15 October 2020, TVS becomes main partner of National Film Development Corporation Malaysia (FINAS) and will finance its publishing work.

References 

2014 establishments in Malaysia
2020 establishments in Malaysia
Internet television channels
Iban-language culture
Malay language television stations
Television stations in Malaysia
Television channels and stations established in 2014
Television channels and stations established in 2020